Isidro Sala Ribera (3 March 1933 – 26 March 2019) was a Peruvian Roman Catholic bishop.

Sala Ribera was born in Peru and was ordained to the priesthood in 1958. He served as titular bishop of Civitanova and as auxiliary bishop of the Roman Catholic Diocese of Abancay from 1986 to 1990. He then served as coadjutor bishop of the diocese from 1990 to 1992 and as bishop of the diocese from 1992 to 2009.

Notes

1933 births
2019 deaths
20th-century Roman Catholic bishops in Peru
21st-century Roman Catholic bishops in Peru
Roman Catholic bishops of Abancay
Peruvian Roman Catholic bishops